Thermoflavifilum is a strictly aerobic, moderately acidophilic and non-spore-forming genus of bacteria from the family of Chitinophagaceae with one known species (Thermoflavifilum aggregans). Thermoflavifilum aggregans has been isolated from soil from the Waikite Valley Thermal Pools in New Zealand.

References

Chitinophagia
Bacteria genera
Monotypic bacteria genera
Taxa described in 2014